Quellón Airport,  is an airport serving Quellón, a city in the Los Lagos Region of Chile. Quellón is on Chiloé Island, on a sheltered harbor off the Gulf of Corcovado.

Approach and departure from either end are over the water.

See also

Transport in Chile
List of airports in Chile

References

External links
OpenStreetMap - Quellón
OurAirports - Quellón

Airports in Chile
Airports in Chiloé Archipelago